Iosif Yefimovich Kheifits (– 24 April 1995) was a Soviet film director, winner of two Stalin Prizes (1941, 1946), People's Artist of USSR (1964), Hero of Socialist Labor (1975). Member of the Communist Party of Soviet Union since 1945.

Life and career
Kheifets was born 17 December 1905 in Minsk. In 1927 he graduated from the Leningrad Technical-screen art, and in 1928 - cinema faculty of Institute of History of Art. In 1928, Iosif Kheifets came to work at the film studio "Sovkino" (now - Lenfilm Studio). In film, he first made his debut as a screenwriter, with Aleksandr Ivanov and Aleksandr Zarkhi he created the scripts for films "Moon on the left" and "Transportation of fire".

Then, Iosif Kheifits became a director, while from 1928 to 1950 he worked with Alexander Zarkhi, headed the 1st Komsomol stage brigade of the Leningrad factory "Sovkino" (now Lenfilm Studio), releasing films on the Soviet youth- "Wind in the face"(1930), "Noon" (1931), the comedy "Hectic Days" (1935). "Baltic Deputy" (1937), with deep historical and psychological truth, great artistic power, showed how great Russian scientist Professor Polezhayev (referring to Kliment Timiryazev, starring Nikolay Cherkasov) joined October revolution. A significant piece of cinema became "Member of the Government" (1939), film centered on the image of a Russian peasant woman (starring Vera Maretskaya), who took the difficult path from a farmhand to a deputy of the Supreme Soviet. Together with Zarkhi he set such films as "His name is Sukhebaator" (1942), "Malakhov Kurgan" (1944), the documentary "The defeat of Japan" (1945). In 1950s he directed such famous films as "A Big Family", "Rumyantsev Case", "My dear man". Then Iosif Kheifits turned towards the Russian classics, filmed works of Anton Chekhov, Ivan Turgenev, Aleksandr Kuprin - "Lady with the Dog", "Good bad man", "Asya", "Shurochka".

In 1970 his film Hail, Mary! entered the 7th Moscow International Film Festival. In 1975 he was a member of the jury at the 9th Moscow International Film Festival.

Deep disclosure of the inner nature of characters, fine understanding of cinematic language and expressive details can be listed as distinctive features of his work.

His films brightly and und unexpectedly opened creative individualities of may actors, such as Iya Savvina, Alexei Batalov, Anatoly Papanov, Oleg Dal, Vladimir Vysotsky, Lyudmila Maksakova, Ada Rogovtseva, Elena Koreneva, Stanislav Sadalskiy.

Many times the director's work were honored with various film awards, including Cannes Film Festival. Last work of Heifits was dramatic film 'Vagrant Bus", which was released in 1989.

Iosif Kheifits died 24 April 1995. He was buried at the cemetery in Komarovo.

Filmography

Directing work

Assistant director
 1928 - Luna Sleva (The Moon Is to the Left)
 1930 - Transport Ognya (Transport of Fire)

Director

 1930 - Wind in the Face
 1931 - Noon
 1933 - My Motherland
 1935 - Hectic Days
 1936 - Baltic Deputy
 1939 - Member of the Government
 1942 - His Name Is Sukhe-Bator
 1944 - The Last Hill
 1946 - In the Name of Life
 1948 - The precious grains
 1950 - The Lights of Baku
 1953 - Spring in Moscow
 1954 - A Big Family
 1955 - The Rumyantsev Case
 1958 - My Beloved
 1961 - The Horizon
 1960 - Lady with the Dog
 1963 - Day of Happiness
 1966 - In S. City
 1971 - Hail, Mary!
 1973 - Bad good man
 1975 - The only one
 1977 - Asya
 1979 - First Time Married
 1983 - Shurotchka
 1986 - The Accused
 1988 - Whose Are You, Old People?
 1989 - Vagrant bus

Written scenarios
 1928 - Moon on the left
 1935 - Hot denechki
 1939 - Member of the Government
 1944 - Malakhov Kurgan
 1986 - Defendant
 1989 - Vagrant bus

Awards and prizes
 Stalin Prize, second class (1941); for the film "Baltic Deputy" (1936)
 Stalin Prize of the first degree (1946); for the documentary "The defeat of Japan" (1945)
 People's Artist of the USSR (1964)
 Hero of Socialist Labor (1975)

References

External links

 Film Reference - Heifitz, Iosif

1905 births
1995 deaths
Film people from Minsk
People from Minsky Uyezd
Belarusian Jews
Communist Party of the Soviet Union members
Soviet film directors
Soviet screenwriters
Male screenwriters
Academic staff of High Courses for Scriptwriters and Film Directors
Socialist realist artists
People's Artists of the USSR
Heroes of Socialist Labour
Recipients of the Order of Lenin
Stalin Prize winners
Recipients of the Order of Friendship of Peoples